Catocala thomsoni is a moth in the family Erebidae first described by A. E. Prout in 1924. It is found in northern China.

References

External links
Original description: 

thomsoni
Moths described in 1924
Moths of Asia